Methuselah, a Biblical figure, was known for living a long time.

Methuselah may also refer to:

Arts, entertainment, and media

Fictional characters and creatures
Methuselah (Redwall), a character in the Redwall novels by Brian Jacques
Methuselah (Trinity Blood), a fictional offshoot of humanity that appear in the anime Trinity Blood
Methuselah (World of Darkness), an ancient and manipulative vampire in White Wolf's novels, RPGs and playable cards
Methuselah, the nickname of Rain Jewlitt, a 624-year-old character in the Immortal Rain manga
Methuselah, the Price family's pet parrot in Barbara Kingsolver's The Poisonwood Bible
Methuselah, a Titan from the MonsterVerse film Godzilla: King of the Monsters

Music
Methuselah (band), an English 1960s rock band
Methuselah (album), a 1969 rock album by Methuselah
Methuselah, the sixth track on San Fermin's 2013 album San Fermin

Science and technology
Methuselah (cellular automaton), a long-surviving pattern in Conway's Game of Life
Methuselah-like proteins, insect proteins that extend the life span of the animal
Methuselah (planet), nickname for PSR B1620-26 b, one of the oldest exoplanets
Methuselah star, nickname for HD 140283, one of the oldest stars known
The Methuselah Foundation, a biomedical charitable organization dedicated to extending healthy life

Long-lived organisms
Methuselah (Judean date palm), a palm tree grown from a 2000-year-old seed at Ketura, Israel 
Methuselah (tree), the second oldest known Great Basin bristlecone pine tree in the White Mountains of California, the second oldest known living tree
Methuselah (sequoia tree), the 27th largest tree in the world, in Sequoia National Forest, California

Other uses
Methuselah (bond), a financial instrument with a 50-year maturity
Methuselah (unit), a UK bottle size for wine

See also
Methuselah's Children, Robert A. Heinlein science fiction novel featuring a long-lived family
"Requiem for Methuselah", Star Trek television episode featuring a long-lived character whose many identities include the biblical Methuselah